Joseph Chiwatenhwa was amongst the first believers of the indigenous peoples of Canada who accepted the Christian faith through the missionary and evangelistic work of the French Province of the Society of Jesus in the 17th century.

Biography
The Jesuits established their first missions in Canada in the early decades of the 1600s and were assisted in Huronia by a number of new believers, amongst whom were Joseph Chiwatenhwa and his wife Marie Aonnetta, in addition to his brother Joseph and other members of the family, all of whom "lived and witnessed to their faith in a heroic manner."
Chiwatenhwa was deeply moved by the Christian teachings of the Jesuit missioners in 1636 when he first encountered them, despite the fact that others of his Huron tribe blamed these missionaries for the epidemics that had broken out in Huron lands.

Chiwatenhwa himself fell sick; after his recovery, however, he was baptized, on August 16, 1637, by Father Jean de Brébeuf, and given the Christian name Joseph. His wife, Aonette, was baptized on March 19, 1638; her Christian name was Marie. Their marriage was blessed on the same day; this was the first Catholic wedding in Huronia.  Joseph became the first lay administrator in the Catholic Church in Canada, in 1639. He helped the Jesuits translate hymns and prayers from French into Huron. He was impressed with the teachings of Saint Ignatius and the Spiritual Exercises. During his eight-day silent retreat, he composed a prayer that reveals his profound experience with Jesus: "You love us so deeply that all I can do in return is to offer myself to you. I chose you as my elder and chief. There is no one else." In adopting his new faith, Joseph drew on many of the spiritual and cultural teachings of his people; he entered the Catholic Church as a Huron. This helped him spread the Good News to many members of his family and tribe.

Joseph Chiwatenhwa sensed that he might eventually be killed for his faith and love for Jesus Christ.  He was martyred on 2 August 1640, aged 38. Jesuit martyr of North America (Canada) Gabriel Lalemant considered Chiwatenhwa a great catechist amongst his own people, "their apostle".

After Joseph's martyrdom his family continued in the service of Christ in collaboration with the Jesuits, and more members of the Huron nation were baptised into the Catholic Church.

Pope John Paul II said at Huronia that "the worthy traditions of the Indian tribes were strengthened and enriched by the Gospel message … not only is Christianity relevant to the Indian peoples, but Christ, in the members of his Body, is himself Indian." Let us be inspired by the faith of Joseph Chiwatenhwa, his wife, Marie Aonette, and their families. They believed in their brother and Saviour Jesus when he spoke the words recorded by Saint John (20:29): "You believe because you can see me. Happy are those who have not seen and yet believe." (CCCB 2010)*

See also 

Kateri Tekakwitha

References 

1640 deaths
17th-century Roman Catholic martyrs
Converts to Roman Catholicism from pagan religions
Native American Roman Catholics
Religious figures of the indigenous peoples of North America